Synaphea is a genus of small shrubs and is endemic to Western Australia. Synapheas have variably shaped leaves but consistently yellow flowers with an unusual pollination mechanism.

Description
Plants in the genus Synaphea are small shrubs, usually with deeply lobed (pinnatipartite) leaves, although some have simple leaves, others pinnate leaves, and have a petiole with a sheathing base. The flowers are relatively small, bright yellow, usually unscented, and arranged in a spike in leaf axils or on the ends of branchlets. The perianth is tube-shaped and zygomorphic, the tube opening in the upper third to half. As in many other members of the Proteaceae, the male anthers and female style are initially in contact and the end of the style is a pollen presenter. In synapheas (and in Conospermum), the anthers and stigma are held together under tension and only separate when touched by a pollinator, ejecting the pollen. The fruit is a hard-shelled nut, but in most species seed set is low.

Taxonomy
The genus Synaphea was first formally described in 1810 by Robert Brown in Transactions of the Linnean Society of London. The first species Brown described was Synaphea favosa and it is therefore the type species. The name Synaphea is from the ancient Greek word synaphe meaning "a connection" or "a union", referring to a connection between a sterile anther and the stigma.

Species
The following is a list of formally named Synaphea species and subspecies accepted by the Australian Plant Census as at April 2020:
  
Synaphea acutiloba Meisn. - granite synaphea
Synaphea aephynsa A.S.George
Synaphea bifurcata A.S.George
Synaphea boyaginensis A.S.George
Synaphea brachyceras R.Butcher
Synaphea canaliculata A.S.George
Synaphea cervifolia A.S.George
Synaphea constricta A.S.George
Synaphea cuneata A.S.George
Synaphea damopsis A.S.George 
Synaphea decorticans Lindl.
Synaphea decumbens A.S.George
Synaphea diabolica R.Butcher
Synaphea divaricata (Benth.) A.S.George
Synaphea drummondii Meisn.
Synaphea endothrix A.S.George
Synaphea favosa R.Br.
Synaphea flabelliformis A.S.George
Synaphea flexuosa A.S.George
Synaphea floribunda A.S.George
Synaphea gracillima Lindl. 
Synaphea grandis A.S.George
Synaphea hians A.S.George
Synaphea incurva A.S.George
Synaphea interioris A.S.George 
Synaphea intricata A.S.George
Synaphea lesueurensis A.S.George
Synaphea macrophylla A.S.George
Synaphea media A.S.George
Synaphea nexosa A.S.George
Synaphea obtusata (Meisn.) A.S.George
Synaphea odocoileops A.S.George
Synaphea oligantha A.S.George 
Synaphea otiostigma A.S.George
Synaphea oulopha A.S.George 
Synaphea pandurata R.Butcher
Synaphea panhesya A.S.George
Synaphea parviflora A.S.George
Synaphea petiolaris R.Br. - synaphea
Synaphea petiolaris R.Br. subsp. petiolaris
Synaphea petiolaris subsp. simplex A.S.George
Synaphea petiolaris subsp. triloba A.S.George
Synaphea pinnata Lindl. - Helena synaphea
Synaphea platyphylla A.S.George
Synaphea polymorpha R.Br. - Albany synaphea   
Synaphea polypodioides R.Butcher
Synaphea preissii Meisn.
Synaphea quartzitica A.S.George
Synaphea rangiferops A.S.George
Synaphea recurva A.S.George
Synaphea reticulata (Sm.) Druce
Synaphea sparsiflora A.S.George
Synaphea spinulosa (Burm.f.) Merr.
Synaphea spinulosa subsp. borealis A.S.George
Synaphea spinulosa subsp. major A.S.George
Synaphea spinulosa (Burm.f.) Merr. subsp. spinulosa
Synaphea stenoloba A.S.George
Synaphea tamminensis A.S.George
Synaphea trinacriformis R.Butcher
Synaphea tripartita A.S.George
Synaphea whicherensis A.S.George
Synaphea xela R.Butcher

Distribution
The genus is endemic to Western Australia.

References

External links

 
Proteaceae genera
Eudicots of Western Australia
Proteales of Australia
Endemic flora of Western Australia